For information on all PennWest California sports, see California Vulcans
The California Vulcans football program is the intercollegiate American football team for Pennsylvania Western University California (known before July 2022 as California University of Pennsylvania), located in California, Pennsylvania. The team competes in NCAA Division II and is a member of the Pennsylvania State Athletic Conference. California University's first football team was fielded in 1916. The Vulcans play home games at the 6,500-seat Hepner–Bailey Field at Adamson Stadium on their campus, and are coached by Gary Dunn.

Notable former players

Notable alumni, and their current (or last) NFL or professional team, include;
Tommie Campbell – Jacksonville Jaguars CB
Brendan Folmar – Pittsburgh Gladiators QB
Eric Kush – Cleveland Browns OL/C
Kevin McCabe – Pittsburgh Steelers (offseason) QB
Rontez Miles – New York Jets FS
C. J. Goodwin – Atlanta Falcons CB
Erik Harris – Oakland Raiders SS
Perry Kemp – Green Bay Packers WR
Wes Cates – Saskatchewan Roughriders RB
Terry O'Shea – Pittsburgh Steelers TE
Dewey McDonald - Seattle Seahawks DB

Playoff appearances

NCAA Division II 
The Vulcans have made seven appearances in the NCAA Division II playoffs. Their combined record is 9-7.

Rivalry

IUP Crimson Hawks

References

External links
 

 
American football teams established in 1916
1916 establishments in Pennsylvania